James Little was a member of the Wisconsin State Assembly in 1859. His grandson, Emery Crosby, was also a member of the Assembly.

References

Members of the Wisconsin State Assembly
Year of birth missing
Year of death missing